Carl O. Pabo is a biophysicist. He is the founder and president of Humanity 2050, a nonprofit institute.

Education

B.S. (summa cum laude) from Yale, Molecular Biophysics and Biochemistry in 1974
Ph.D. from Harvard, Biochemistry and Molecular Biology in 1980.

Career
Pabo has been a professor at the Johns Hopkins University School of Medicine (1982–1991) and at the Massachusetts Institute of Technology (1991–2001) and an investigator with the Howard Hughes Medical Institute (1986–2001). He's been a visiting professor at Caltech, Stanford, Berkeley and Harvard. At Caltech, he taught a course called “The World in 2050.”  

He was chief scientific officer at Sangamo BioSciences from 2001–2003.

In 2018, he founded Humanity 2050 to “to advocate a more comprehensive, coherent way of thinking about the human future.”  
He also serves as a scientific advisor for NanoDimension.

Awards and honors
Pabo became a Guggenheim Fellow in 2005. He is a member of the National Academy of Sciences and of the American Academy of Arts and Sciences. Was awarded the Pfizer Award in Enzyme Chemistry in 1992. He has also won the Protein Society Young Investigator Award and the Pfizer Award in enzymology.

References

1952 births
Living people
Yale University alumni
Harvard University alumni
Johns Hopkins University faculty
Massachusetts Institute of Technology faculty
Fellows of the American Academy of Arts and Sciences
American biochemists
Fellows of the American Academy of Microbiology